Several organizations award a Progress Medal:

 Progress Medal (RPS) – the Royal Photographic Society's highest award.
 Progress Medal (SMPTE) – award by the Society of Motion Picture and Television Engineers
 Progress Award (PSA) – award by the Photographic Society of America